The Trebišnjica is a river in Bosnia and Herzegovina.

In classical antiquity, the river was known as the Arion, rising and sinking through its course before resurfacing at various places from the Neretva to the coast.

Sources
The Trebišnjica river originate near town of Bileća. The source of the river is a system of strong karstic wellsprings distributed in two principal aquifer zones, geographically and hydrologically distinct albeit in relatively close proximity to each other. In both zones group of wellsprings raises from the underground, consisting of a number of large, abundant founts each.

The first, at the head of the river and at the outskirts of Bileća town, is the Trebišnjica wellsprings group, consisting of three large wellsprings, with Dejanova Pećina as primer outflow, and two secondary ones, wellspring Oko and Nikšičko Vrelo.

The second zone, Čepelica river spring-group ("Čeplica spring-group") at Ćeplica village, is located  further down the stream from first group. The Čepelica spring-group consists of two main karst hydrological features, Wellspring Čepo (Vrelo "Čepo") with three main outlets, and group of smaller estavelles (sinkholes) and springs on the left-bank side of the Čeplica river streambed.

Formation of the Bileća Lake has affected the region significantly, both underground as well as at the ground level, with the extent of ecological impact still, after several decades, not being fully assessed. Entire system of the Trebišnjica wellsprings, its both groups, were part of the characteristic Dinaric karst landscape, with significant aesthetic value. However entire area surrounding the Trebišnjica river, its headwaters with sources, Miruška valley, Popovo Polje, many villages and productive land is flooded in 1967 by the Bilećko Lake, formed after construction of the Grnčarevo dam, with the primary purpose of serving as an artificial water reservoir for the Trebinje-1 Hydroelectric Power Station turbines.

Upper course

As it flows in an area of karst (limestone), the Trebišnjica actually represents a very complex system of the above and underground streams. It originates in Bosnia and Herzegovina from two streams from the Lebršnik and Čemerno mountains:

 one stream, the Mušnica, flows from the eastern to the western border of the Gatačko Polje ("Field of Gacko") (from the mountain Lebršnik to Bjelašnica, passes through Lake Klinje and next to the settlements of Avtovac, Gacko, Srđevići, Bašići, Drugovići, Kula, and Branilovići, before it sinks into the karst in the Cerničko Polje ("Field of Cernica", west of Baba Mountain at the village of Cernica under the name of Ključka rijeka (River of Ključ), after a nearby village of Ključ.
 another stream, the Gračanica, flows from the Čemerno mountain also into the Gatačko Polje, next to the villages of Bahori and Gračanica, before it meets the Mušnica near Srđevići. Both streams are characterized by very sharp, almost erratic bends and changes of direction.

The river shortly re-appears in the Fatničko Polje (Field of Fatnica) under the name of Fatnička reka (River of Fatnica), only to sink again after a short flow above the ground.

Middle course

The river flows to the south, through the depression of Miruša. On the southernmost part of the depression, the river is dammed by the Grancarevo Dam at the village of Gornje Grančarevo and completely flooded upstream by the artificial Lake Bileća. Nearly all of the eastern bank of the lake belongs to Montenegro.

The Trebišnjica turns west between the villages of Donje Grnčarevo and Lastva into the Trebinjsko polje (Field of Trebinje), being dammed again at Gorica, with a small reservoir. The river continues to the west following the southern slopes of Bjelasnica mountain, through the town of Trebinje and villages of Dražin Do, Tvrdoš, Gornja Kočela and Donja Kočela, and enters the largest karst field in the Balkans, Popovo Polje (Priest's Field).

In Popovo Polje, the Trebišnjica used to sink (see Regulation below), right after the Trebinje. In the field, the river turns northwest, next to the villages of Staro Slano, Đedići, Dobromani, Žakovo, Tulje, Sedlari, Grmljani and Zavala, near the Vjetrenica cave, the largest in Bosnia and Herzegovina. The river then turns north, curves between the villages of Dvrsnica, Orašje, Čavaš and Turkovići and in the lower Popovo Polje, near the Croatian border, sinks into the several big sinking holes (most notably, the Doljašnica and Ponikva holes.

Lower course

The waters of the Trebišnjica from the Popovo Polje, re-appear as three separate outflows:
 The powerful spring of Čapljina, in the area of the lower Neretva river, in Hercegovina.
 A series of underwater springs (called vrulje, "boiling water") near the small sea harbor of Slano in Croatia, northwest of Dubrovnik.
The watercourse is called the Ombla River (Umbla; or Dubrovačka rijeka, "River of Dubrovnik"). Several suburbs of Dubrovnik (Mokošica, Komolac, Rožat, Prijevor, Lozica) are located alongside the river. Water from the river has been used by the Dubrovnik waterworks since 1437.

Damming, regulation and importance

As a river that flows in geologically unstable terrain (karst) and with such an interrupted flow, the Trebišnjica contains enormous potential for hydroelectricity production. As a result, regulatory works on the Trebišnjica were arguably the most massive ones in the former Yugoslavia.

 1965. The river was dammed at the village of Gorica, creating artificial lake as an auxiliary water basin for the future hydro-electrical power station (HE) Trebinje. The water of the lake is conducted by two parallel, -long, hydro-energetic tunnels into the Croatian village of Plat, on the Adriatic coast, near the Cavtat, where HE Dubrovnik is constructed.
 1967. The dam for HE Trebinje (or Grnčarevo) was constructed, creating huge Lake Bileća (or Lake Miruša; area , altitude , depth , volume ). The old Arslanagić bridge was deconstructed and moved to Trebinje. Together with HE Dubrovnik, two power stations have a power of 422 MW and capacity for production of 2.19 billion kWh yearly.
 1979. The power station has a power of 430 MW (two aggregates of 215 MW) and capacity for 619 million kWh yearly.
 1979.

See also
 Bregava
 Buna (Neretva)
 Trebižat
 Krupa
 Hutovo Blato

References

Sources
 Mala Prosvetina Enciklopedija, Third edition (1985); Prosveta; 
 Jovan Đ. Marković (1990): Enciklopedijski geografski leksikon Jugoslavije; Svjetlost-Sarajevo;

External links

 
Rivers of Bosnia and Herzegovina
International rivers of Europe
Sinking rivers of Bosnia and Herzegovina
Popovo Polje
Lower Horizons Hydroelectric Power Stations System
Upper Horizons Hydroelectric Power Stations System